"Blowing Away" (sometimes written as "Blowin' Away") is a song written by Laura Nyro and included on her 1967 album More Than a New Discovery. In 1969, the 5th Dimension recorded it for their album The Age of Aquarius. Also released as a single, the 5th Dimension's version reached number 21 on the Billboard Hot 100. The song was produced by Bones Howe and arranged by Bill Holman, Bob Alcivar, and Howe.

References

1967 songs
1969 singles
Songs written by Laura Nyro
Laura Nyro songs
The 5th Dimension songs
Song recordings produced by Bones Howe
Song recordings produced by Milt Okun